Emil Abossolo M'Bo  (born 29 August 1958) is a Cameroonian-French actor who has portrayed in French, African and American productions.

Early and personal life
Abossolo was born on 29 August 1958 in Yaoundé, the capital city of Cameroon. His father took him to the movie theatre when he was 6 years old. Since that day acting has been his passion. Abossolo has been living in France for over twenty years now.
He has a son named Akeva.

Career
Abossolo is a multi-lingual actor. He speaks five languages (English, French, Spanish, Portuguese and his native language Beti). His career started on stage, where he played Hamlet, Titus Andronicus and La Tragédie du Roi Christophe.
He starred in several French television shows such as La Brigade des Mineurs and Plus Belle la Vie.
Internationally he is mostly known for his appearances in the television show Highlander: The Series, Queen of Swords, and The Young Indiana Jones Chronicles.
More recently, Emil has been playing in African productions.
He played in Ezra, the movie that received the 2007 Stallion of Yennenga at the Panafrican Film and Television Festival of Ouagadougou in Burkina Faso, West Africa.

Theater

Filmography

External links 

1958 births
Living people
20th-century French male actors
21st-century French male actors
Cameroonian emigrants to France
French male film actors
French male stage actors
French male television actors
People from Yaoundé